Lafangey is a 2022 Pakistani Urdu-language horror-comedy drama film directed by Abdul Khaliq Khan who also wrote the screenplay. It starrs Sami Khan, Saleem Meiraj, Mani alongside Mubeen Gabol and Nazish Jahangir. According to media reports, the film is an unofficial remake of 2017 Indian Telugu-language film Anando Brahma. It was released on 10 July 2022 on the occasion of Eid-ul-Azha and received poor reviews from critics. The film was initially rejected by the Central Board of Film Censors.

Cast 

 Sami Khan
 Saleem Meiraj
 Mubeen Gabol
 Mani
 Nazish Jahangir
 Behroze Sabzwari
 Rasheed Naz
 Sohail Asghar
 Gul-e-Rana

Release 

It released on 10 July 2022 on the occasion of Eid-ul-Azha.

Controversy
The film was rejected by the censor board due to some vulgar dialogues as stated by the sources. However, it was allowed to release.

Reception 

Mohammad Kamran Jawaid of Dawn praised the performances of a number of the actors but criticised the lack of originality of the film as it heavily copied Anando Brahma.

References 

2022 films
Pakistani horror films
Pakistani remakes of Indian films
2020s comedy horror films
2020s Urdu-language films
Urdu-language Pakistani films